Tinjska Gora is a settlement in the hills west of Slovenska Bistrica in northeastern Slovenia. The area is part of Styria. It is now included with the rest of the municipality in the Drava Statistical Region.

References

External links
Tinjska Gora at Geopedia

Populated places in the Municipality of Slovenska Bistrica